Xyris flabelliformis, the savannah yelloweyed grass, is a North American species of flowering plant in the yellow-eyed-grass family. It is native to the coastal plain of the United States from eastern Mississippi to the Carolinas.

Xyris flabelliformis is a perennial herb up to 30 cm (12 inches) tall with thread-like leaves up to 10 cm (4 inches) long, and yellow flowers.

References

External links
Photo of herbarium specimen at Missouri Botanical Garden, collected in 1896 in Florida

flabelliformis
Plants described in 1860
Flora of the Southeastern United States
Taxa named by Alvan Wentworth Chapman